Jia Tianzi (born 28 February 1994 in Chengdu) is a Chinese footballer who plays for Shanghai SIPG in the Chinese Super League.

Club career
In 2011, Jia started his senior football career with China League Two club Sichuan FC. He went to Portugal following Chinese Football Association 500.com Stars Project in the end of 2011. He joined Casa Pia youth team system and returned to Sichuan FC in June 2012. After scoring three goals in three matches of the 2012 season, he transferred to another Portuguese club Real Sport Clube. Jia joined Terceira Divisão side Amora in January 2013. On 3 March 2013, he made his senior debut and scored first goal at Portugal in a 2–1 away defeat against Lourinhanense. He made a free transfer to Segunda Liga side S.C. Covilhã in September 2013. On 8 December 2013, he made his debut for Covilhã in a league match against C.D. Aves where he coming on as a substitute for Inters Gui in the 87th minute.

Jia joined Chinese Super League side Shanghai Shenxin in July 2014. He made his debut for Shanghai Shenxin on 6 August 2014 in the 2014 Chinese FA Cup against Shanghai Shenhua, coming on for Hou Junjie in the 58th minute. He made his Super League debut three days later on 9 August 2014 in a 1–0 home defeat against Guizhou Renhe, coming on as a substitute for Xu Wen in the 62nd minute.

On 5 February 2017, Jia moved to Super League side Shanghai SIPG.

Career statistics 
Statistics accurate as of match played 31 December 2020.

References

External links

1994 births
Living people
Chinese footballers
Footballers from Sichuan
Sportspeople from Chengdu
Association football midfielders
Liga Portugal 2 players
Chinese Super League players
China League One players
China League Two players
S.C. Covilhã players
Shanghai Shenxin F.C. players
Shanghai Port F.C. players
Chinese expatriate footballers
Expatriate footballers in Portugal
Chinese expatriate sportspeople in Portugal